664 Judith is a minor planet orbiting the Sun. It was named after the biblical character Judith.

References

External links 
 
 

000664
Discoveries by August Kopff
Named minor planets
000664
19080624